Semper Fi is a 1998 strategy video game developed by Stanley Associates and published by Interactive Magic.

Gameplay 
Semper Fi is a turn-based strategy game in which the player commands a Marine battalion.

Reception

GameSpot gave the game a score of 6.8 out of 10 rating stating, "The truth of the matter is, if you can take the 'Semper Fi' slogan and the USMC logos and replace them with pretty much anything else, you'd still have nothing more than an OK game struggling to be something much better."

References

1998 video games
Turn-based strategy video games
Video games about the United States Marine Corps